James Staples may refer to:

 Jim Staples (born 1965), rugby union footballer
 James T. Staples, a 1908 Tombigbee River sternwheel paddle steamer